Figueiredo may refer to:

Places
 Figueiredo (Amares), a parish in Amares municipality in Portugal
 Figueiredo (Braga), a parish in Braga municipality in Portugal
 Figueiredo River, a river in the Brazilian state of Ceará

People with the surname
Elísio de Figueiredo, the first ambassador of Angola to the United Nations
 Elton Figueiredo, Brazilian footballer
 Germano de Figueiredo, Portuguese football player
 Igor Figueiredo, professional snooker player from Brazil
 João Figueiredo, the last president of the dictatorial period in Brazil
 Paulo Figueiredo, Angolan footballer
 Tobias Figueiredo (born 1994), Portuguese footballer
 Wílton Figueiredo, Brazilian footballer
 Figueiredo (footballer), Brazilian footballer

Portuguese-language surnames